Upper Waterhay Meadow is a 2.8 hectare biological Site of Special Scientific Interest in north Wiltshire, England, notified in 1971. It lies on the Thames floodplain in Ashton Keynes parish, downstream (east) of Ashton Keynes village and west of the town of Cricklade.

The site is known for the snakeshead fritillary, which occurs predominantly in its less common white form. Since it was bought by Wiltshire Wildlife Trust in 1970, the alluvial grassland has been managed for the benefit of the fritillaries.

References

 Natural England details and citation sheet for the site (accessed 23 June 2021)

External links
 English Nature website (SSSI information)

Sites of Special Scientific Interest in Wiltshire
Sites of Special Scientific Interest notified in 1971
Wiltshire Wildlife Trust reserves
Meadows in Wiltshire